Ashleigh Shanti (born circa 1991) is an American chef and sommelier. She is a freelance chef and was the chef de cuisine of Benne on Eagle in Asheville, North Carolina. Shanti specializes in African American foodways, including Black Appalachian cuisine.

Early life and education

Shanti is originally from North Carolina. She lived in Nairobi, Kenya for a gap year. Upon her return, she attended Hampton University. After graduating from Hampton, she moved to Baltimore, Maryland to attend culinary school. She eventually earned her sommelier certification.

Career

Early in her career, Shanti worked as a cook and culinary event producer in Virginia Beach, Virginia. After culinary school, she worked for Cindy Wolf at Charleston and Cinghiale in Baltimore, Maryland. She bartended briefly and worked in catering in El Paso, Texas.

For over two years, Shanti worked as Vivian Howard's culinary assistant. Shanti supported Howard's work in A Chef's Life. Shanti appeared alongside Howard in the episode "Dumpling Dilemma" of Howard's television show Somewhere South.

Upon leaving her position with Howard, Shanti began traveling the U.S., struggling to figure out where and what she wanted to do or where she wanted to live. During her travels, she was inspired by her visit to The Grey and a conference in Denmark, where she saw Jeannette Ehlers talk about reclaiming African history. She worked at minibar, the José Andrés restaurant in Washington, D.C.

During a camping trip to Shenandoah National Park, Shanti saw a display at the visitors center about African Americans in Appalachia. Her grandmother and great-grandmother lived in the Appalachian Mountain. The culmination of the display and her maternal heritage inspired Shanti to begin pursuing Black Appalachian cuisine.

In October 2018, Shanti met John Fleer, owner-chef of Rhubarb. Fleer and Shanti had similar culinary interests: celebrating African and African American culinary traditions. Fleer hired Shanti serve as chef de cuisine and to help create the menu at Benne on Eagle, the restaurant at The Foundry Hotel in Asheville. The restaurant opened in December 2018.

In 2019, Shanti was named one of "16 Black Chefs Changing Food in America" by The New York Times. That same year, she was also named one of Eater's "Young Guns" of the year and Benne on Eagle was named one of Bon Appetit'''s Best New Restaurants.

Shanti was named a semi-finalist for the 2020 James Beard Award for "Rising Star Chef of the Year."

Shanti competed in Top Chef: Houston, the nineteenth season of the television series Top Chef, which aired in 2022.

Her restaurant, Good Hot Fish'', a modern-day fish camp is set to open in Fall 2022 in South Asheville, North Carolina.

Cuisine

Shanti's cuisine often explores Black Appalachian food, Southern food and soul food. Her modern interpretations of early Black American food also incorporates West African, Japanese, European and American cuisine.

Examples of dishes created by Shanti includes hummus made with black-eyed peas and sesame; okonomiyaki inspired by her mother's salmon and cabbage fritters; buttermilk cornbread soup, the latter based on her grandmother's recipe; collard greens salad with fried plantain and sumac; farro-vegetable hash with chermoula; cornmeal pancakes with strawberry compote; and benne-seed biscuits with local country ham and hollandaise.

Personal life

Shanti loves rap music and writes rap songs in her free time.

References

External links

"While Chef Ashleigh Shanti Works From Home, She's Staying In The Fight For Her Staff" from Blue Ridge Public Radio

1990s births
African-American chefs
Sommeliers
People from Asheville, North Carolina
Chefs from North Carolina
Hampton University alumni
American women chefs
American chefs
LGBT chefs
LGBT people from North Carolina
Living people
21st-century African-American people
21st-century African-American women
Top Chef contestants